Al-Asr, (The Declining Day, Eventide, The Epoch, Time) is the 103rd chapter (sūrah) of the Qur’ān, the Muslim holy book. It contains three āyāt or verses. Surat al-‘Asr is the third shortest chapter after Al-Kawthar and Al-Nasr, being shorter than Al-Nasr by only two words in the 3rd verse.۝ By the afternoon;
۝ verily man employeth himself in that which will prove of loss:
۝ except those who believe, and do that which is right; and who mutually recommend the truth, and mutually recommend perseverance unto each other.

Summary
1-2 Men generally seek for gain and find loss
3 The righteous, however, are the exception to this rule 

 Text and meaning 
Text and transliteration
Hafs from Aasim ibn Abi al-Najud

¹ 

² 

³ 

Warsh from Nafiʽ al-Madani

¹ 

² 

³ 

 Meaning 

By Al-'Asr (the time).

Verily! Man is in loss,

Except those who believe (in Islamic Monotheism) and do righteous good deeds, and recommend one another to the truth (i.e. order one another to perform all kinds of good deeds (Al-Ma'ruf) which Allah has ordained, and abstain from all kinds of sins and evil deeds (Al-Munkar) which Allah has forbidden), and recommend one another to patience (for the sufferings, harms, and injuries which one may encounter in Allah's Cause during preaching His religion of Islamic Monotheism or Jihad, etc.).

By time,

Indeed, mankind is in loss,

Except for those who have believed and done righteous deeds and advised each other to truth and advised each other to patience.

By (the Token of) Time (through the ages),

Verily Man is in loss,

Except such as have Faith, and do righteous deeds, and (join together) in the mutual teaching of Truth, and of Patience and Constancy.

By the declining day,

Lo! man is a state of loss,

Save those who believe and do good works, and exhort one another to truth and exhort one another to endurance.

Timing and contextual background of revelation
Regarding the timing and contextual background of the revelation (asbāb al-nuzūl''), it is an earlier "Meccan surah", which means it is believed to have been revealed in Mecca, instead of later in Medina.

According to some, it follows sūrah 94 in the chronological order of the Quran.

Theme and subject matter
This sura teaches that all human beings are in loss, except those who have iman (faith in Islam), do righteous deeds and remind others of the Haqq (truth, rights, reality) and remind others of Sabr (patience).

The text of the Sura can be translated as the following:

1.|وَالْعَصْرِ‌

By time (it explain that God swears By time).

2. 

Indeed man is in loss,

3.  ‌

except those who have faith and do righteous deeds, and enjoin one another to [follow] the truth, and enjoin one another to patience.

Importance
This sura is considered the summary of whole Quran by almost all notable classical and modern Islamic scholars including Imam Shafi, Ibn Kathir, Israr Ahmed and Farhat Hashmi.
Ibn Kathir, a traditional exegete, holds that this sura is a warning to believers not to waste time or they could be humiliated or even ruined.
Imam Shafi, a jurist and traditional scholar of Islam, held that if God had only revealed this surah it would have been sufficient for the guidance of all humankind. It summarized the very essence of the Qur'anic message. Thus, Imam Shafi’i asserts that if one followed its counsel, it was enough for humankind to achieve success in life.
Sayyid Qutb, a modern exegete of the Qur'an, asserts that this surah outlines a complete system for human life based on an Islamic viewpoint. He says that it defines, in the clearest and most concise form, the basic concept of faith in the context of its comprehensive reality. He further says that he is gravely shocked to see the loss and ruin in which humanity finds itself. He is critical of Muslims and non-Muslims and particularly witnessing that humankind is turning away from the goodness that God has bestowed upon it. He is confident that the guidance of this surah is what made the early Muslim great as it can do for those that follow it in the long history of humanity. He says that once the early Arabs were aroused by such surahs, they quickly burst the bounds of Arabia and zealously worked toward the salvation of humanity.
 Al-Tabarani: when humankind finds itself at a loss; it can revive itself by returning to the formula provided by the third verse and the four principles/conditions, which are adhered to as a foundation. We saw how these four principles operated on both physical and spiritual levels. This is probably the reason why the companions of the Prophet did not want to become heedless of the foundational message of Islam. Consequently, they used to meet one another and only depart until one of them recited surat-Al-Asr to the other and they bid peace upon one another.
All these exegetes offer a terse reminder of the importance of time and care in its utilization.

Commentary
Abul Ala Maududi: This Surah is a matchless specimen of comprehensiveness and brevity. A whole world of meaning has been compressed into its few brief words, which is too vast in content to be fully expressed even in a book. In it, in a clear and plain way it has been stated what is the way to true success for man and what is the way to ruin and destruction for him. Imam Shafi has very rightly said that if the people only considered this Surah well, it alone would suffice them for their guidance.
Al-Tabarani: How important this Surah was in the sight of the Companions can be judged from the tradition cited from Abdullah bin Hisn ad-Darimi Abu Madinah, according to which whenever any two of them met they would not part company until they had recited Surah Al-Asr to each other.
Mufti Muhammad Shafi: the Struggle of the human being is like the one who is trying to sell ice. It is melting away and he needs to sell it quickly and make as much sales before the end of the day comes. Otherwise - all his valuables' and efforts will go to waste. [In the past - there were no Freezers, so your ice would melt into water by the end of the day.]
Tafsir al-Mazhari: The taNween ن at the end of KhusriN makes it an INCREDIBLE Loss. Al Insaan - (lil Jins - to all human beings) - there is no exception - the entire category. A universal statement. The statement directly targets you.
Al-Zamakhshari: People are in tremendous loss because of that which they buy and sell in life (of good and bad), except for the Saaliheen (righteous). O Allah, make us of the Saliheen (righteous), ameen. Because the Saliheen buy for the next life instead of for the pleasures of this life. And then they were profitable and happy on Judgment Day, and whoever was an enemy to their buying - then he was in loss and despair.
Muhammad ash-Shawkani: Every human is in a state of buying and selling than others. He exhausts his ages (youth, middle age, seniority etc.) in purchasing Allah's pleasure. Rushing in gathering Allah's reward. Also refer to tafsir sura at-Takathur.
Al-Akhfash al-Akbar said: - Khusr [loss] means Halaka حالك [violent death]. Mawt موت  - general death. So the disbeliever is setting himself up for a violent death by being in this loss.
Ibn Taymiyyah: (as quoted by Muhammad Shafi Deobandi' in Maariful Quran): Humanity is kept from accepting the truth of Islam by 2 obstacles; 1 - Shubuhaat (Doubts) and 2 - Shahawaat (Temptations). Either one of these lead people astray. It is an intellectual problem (people feel answers by callers to Islam are not satisfactory). It is a psychological problem (people want to follow forbidden desires).
Shah Waliullah: in At-Tadhkeer bi ayyaamillah - Remembrance of the Days of Allah. By Allah saying; Wa-al 'Asr - We will remember the special Days of Allah. The Days when; Allah created the human being (Adam in Islam), the Day He revealed the Qur'an to Prophet Muhammad, the Day Allah drowned the disbelievers of Prophet Nuh, the Day Allah destroyed Pharaoh and saved Moses, the Day of Badr, the Day when Allah spoke to Musa. The Day of Judgment, the Day the believers will see Allah. By saying al 'Asr - we will remember these Days so we will not want to be in loss.
Ibn Kathir: Aladheena aamanoo (believe - with their hearts),  (do good deeds - with their limbs), and they enjoin each other to the truth by doing and enjoining on others to do acts of obedience and to abandon all that is forbidden, and they enjoin each other to perseverance against all calamities and they held to and advised to Emaan with perseverance whenever they were tortured for enjoining the truth.
Muhammad Ash-Shanqeeti: Tawwaassu bil haq - telling each other about the truth after doing good deeds. The 'amil as-saalihaat was good deeds - general ('aam), and enjoining the truth was khaas (specific).
Al-Zamakhshari: Watawaasu bis-sabr (enjoin upon each other perseverance) - Sabr over whatever Allah tests His slave with, perseverance in obedience to Allah, and in times of temptation. Allah put Sabr at the end and haqq first, and enjoining the haqq as more important. And more noble.
Muhammad Ash-Shanqeeti: As-Sabireen - whenever a situation of patience is required - this person is patient. Through all circumstances.

Notes

References

External links
Quran 103 Clear Quran translation
Commentary on Surah al-Asr by Sheikh Ibn Uthaymeen 

Asr